Sharon Catherine Claydon (born 26 April 1964) is an Australian politician. She has been a Labor member of the Australian House of Representatives, representing the Division of Newcastle in New South Wales, since September 2013.

Early life
Claydon was born on 26 April 1964 in Camperdown, New South Wales. Her father Kevin was an Australian Army soldier and she first attended school at Holsworthy Barracks. He left the army shortly after completing a tour of duty in Vietnam in 1970. The family subsequently lived in Bermagui for several years where she learned to ride horses, later moving to the Newcastle suburb of New Lambton Heights where she attended Lambton High School.

After leaving school, Claydon enrolled at the University of Sydney as an arts and law student. She left after two years to return to Newcastle, where through a job centre she found work at Helen Springs Station in the Northern Territory. She was recruited as a gardener but later worked as a jillaroo and camp cook. After a few years, Claydon returned to New South Wales, where she worked for a disability service provider on the South Coast. She later returned to university and completed an honours degree majoring in anthropology. She subsequently began a PhD thesis on "contemporary political representation in the Bunuba Aboriginal community", moving to Fitzroy Crossing, Western Australia. She worked in remote Aboriginal communities "for the best part of decade" before returning to Newcastle.

Politics
Claydon joined the ALP in 1999 and worked as an electorate officer for federal MPs Allan Morris and Sharon Grierson. She was a state conference delegate from 2002 and a national conference delegate from 2007. She also served on the state administrative committee and was a member of the national policy forum. In 2008, she was elected to the Newcastle City Council.

Parliamentary career
In July 2012, Claydon announced she would run for ALP preselection in the seat of Newcastle following the retirement of Sharon Grierson. At the time she was described by the Newcastle Herald as "a popular figure in the local branches, particularly in the party's left faction, and is well connected with the ALP hierarchy after serving for several years on the powerful NSW Labor administrative committee". She was elected to the House of Representatives at the 2013 federal election.

Claydon has been on the speaker's panel since 2015. She has also been deputy chair of the joint select committee into the National Redress Scheme and the House standing committee on social policy and legal affairs. In this role, she has been an advocate for victims of institutional abuse, raising awareness that as of early 2021, only 51 people had received compensation payouts out of 2728 applications. She is a member of the Labor Left faction.

In July 2022, following the ALP's victory at the 2022 election, Claydon was chosen as the party's nominee for Deputy Speaker of the House of Representatives.

Personal
Claydon is currently a patron of the Stockton Historical Society and has served as treasurer of the Newcastle Aboriginal Support Group.

References

External links
Official website
Parliament of Australia profile

 
Profile at TheyVoteForYou.org.au

1964 births
Living people
Australian Labor Party members of the Parliament of Australia
Australian anthropologists
Australian women anthropologists
New South Wales local councillors
Labor Left politicians
Members of the Australian House of Representatives
Members of the Australian House of Representatives for Newcastle
People from Newcastle, New South Wales
Women members of the Australian House of Representatives
21st-century Australian politicians
21st-century Australian women politicians
Women local councillors in Australia
University of Sydney alumni